Vishnuvardhana II (673 – 682 C.E.) became the Eastern Chalukya king following the very short rule of his father Indra Bhattaraka.

His son Mangi Yuvaraja succeeded him.

References 
 Durga Prasad, History of the Andhras up to 1565 A. D., P. G. Publishers, Guntur (1988)
 Nilakanta Sastri, K.A. (1955). A History of South India, OUP, New Delhi (Reprinted 2002).

Eastern Chalukyas
Telugu monarchs